Joseph-Hector Leduc (1864 – February 22, 1901) was a merchant and political figure in Quebec. He represented Nicolet in the Canadian House of Commons from 1891 to 1896 and from 1897 to 1900 as a Liberal member.

He was born in Saint-Léonard, Canada East, the son of Hubert Leduc, and was educated at the Collège de Nicolet. In the 1891 federal election, after a recount, it was determined that he had defeated the Conservative candidate E.C. Prince by a single vote. Leduc was defeated by Fabien Boisvert when he ran for reelection in 1896, but was elected in an 1897 by-election held after Boisvert died in office.

By-election: On Mr. Boisvert's death, 12 November 1897

References 
 
 The Canadian parliamentary companion, 1891, AJ Gemmill

1864 births
1901 deaths
Members of the House of Commons of Canada from Quebec
Liberal Party of Canada MPs